Vernacular Music Research is an archival and historical collection of music. It includes print (books, sheet music, orchestrations), 78' records, and other media featuring American music and dance from the early 19th century to the 1960s.
It was founded by jazz historian Thornton Hagert. Jazz.com lists his name as "Tony Hagert" for albums "Come & Trip it" & "Too Much Mustard" with trombonist Dave Sager.

The Archive
The Archive itself consists of about 125,000 items of printed
music, 75,000 items of recorded music, 5,500 books and
2,000 periodicals on New World Vernacular music, dance, and
related topics.

Services
Research and historical writing has been compiled for has been prepared for The Smithsonian's  "An Experiment in Modern Music: Paul Whiteman at Aeolian Hall. Smithsonian Collection recording DMM 2-0518", and the Maryland Historical Society,

The archive has provided sheet music, recorded music, and referenced source material for books and publications including:

"Habaneras, Maxixies & Tangos: The Syncopated Piano Music of Latin America" author Bill Matthiesen made special note of the use of Thornton Hagert's research, sheet music and orchestration.

Ragged but Right by Lynn Abbott features sheet music from the Archive. Printed by University of Mississippi 

Come & Trip It "Instrumental Dance Music, 1780s-1920s"  Released on New World Records
The Release is even currently for sale on Amazon, with reviews included- Come & Trip It

It also received a special thanks from the author of "Black Manhattan", conductor Rick Benjamin. Maintained by Recorded Anthology of American Music, Inc.

Was a contributor to the Eubie Blake Collection with the Maryland Historical Society. They maintain correspondence between Hagert & Eubie Blake.

"Ragtime : its history, composers, and music" by John Edward Hasse and published on
Schirmer Books, 1985 also references the archive.

Record Research features research and writing in partnership with Jean C Averty on numerous articles throughout the 70s and 80s.
Provided Samples of Music for book The Devil's Horn (The Devil's Horn: The Story of the Saxophone, From Noisy Novelty to King of Cool. Farrar, Straus & Giroux. ) 

Participated in the book Pioneers of Jazz: The Story of the Creole Band by Lawrence Gushee Page 552 

Provided sheet music cover of "Oh you Devil! Rag" for a University of Mississippi book Ragged but Right

References

Music archives in the United States